Vladimir Aleksandrovich Ridel (born 22 June 1985) is a Russian former professional football player.

Club career
He made his Russian Football National League debut for FC Zhemchuzhina-Sochi on 27 March 2010 in a game against FC Baltika Kaliningrad.

External links
 

1985 births
Sportspeople from Vladikavkaz
Living people
Russian footballers
Association football midfielders
FC Zhemchuzhina Sochi players
FC Salyut Belgorod players
FC Volgar Astrakhan players
FC Fakel Voronezh players
FC Chernomorets Novorossiysk players
FC Dynamo Stavropol players
FC Avangard Kursk players
FC Smena Komsomolsk-na-Amure players